"Bed of Clouds" is a song by Swift K.I.D. featuring Australian recording artist Guy Sebastian. It was released in Australia on 18 February 2013 and peaked at number 42 on the ARIA Singles Chart

The track is lifted from Swift K.I.D.’s forthcoming debut EP entitled Montré-all.

Music video
The video premiered on 14 April 2013. It was directed by Kris Moyes.

Track listing
Digital download
"Bed of Clouds" – 3:50

Charts

References

2013 singles
2013 songs
Guy Sebastian songs
Songs written by Guy Sebastian